Alucita maxima is a moth of the family Alucitidae. It is found in Libya.

References

Moths described in 1924
Alucitidae
Moths of Africa